1267 Geertruida, provisional designation , is a carbonaceous background asteroid from the inner regions of the asteroid belt, approximately 20 kilometers in diameter. Discovered by astronomer Hendrik van Gent at Johannesburg Observatory in 1930, the asteroid was later named after Geertruid Pels, sister of Dutch astronomer Gerrit Pels.

Discovery 

Geertruida was discovered on 23 April 1930, by Dutch astronomer Hendrik van Gent at the Union Observatory in Johannesburg, South Africa. Five nights later, it was independently discovered by German astronomer Karl Reinmuth at Heidelberg Observatory on 28 April 1930. The Minor Planet Center only recognizes the first discoverer.

Orbit and classification 

Geertruida is a non-family asteroid from the main belt's background population. It orbits the Sun in the inner asteroid belt at a distance of 2.0–2.9 AU once every 3 years and 11 months (1,417 days; semi-major axis of 2.47 AU). Its orbit has an eccentricity of 0.18 and an inclination of 5° with respect to the ecliptic. The body's observation arc begins with its official discovery observation at Johannesburg in April 1930.

Physical characteristics 

Geertruida is an assumed carbonaceous C-type asteroid, which agrees with its measured albedo (see below).

Rotation period 

In 1977, a rotational lightcurve of Geertruida was obtained from photometric observations by Swedish astronomer Claes-Ingvar Lagerkvist at the Uppsala Southern Station in Australia. Lightcurve analysis gave a rotation period of 5.50 hours with a brightness amplitude of 0.5 magnitude. In October 2016, a refined period of 5.5087 hours with an amplitude of 0.35 magnitude was obtained at the Oakley Southern Sky Observatory.

Diameter and albedo 

According to the surveys carried out by the Infrared Astronomical Satellite IRAS, the Japanese Akari satellite and the NEOWISE mission of NASA's Wide-field Infrared Survey Explorer, Geertruida measures between 15.621 and 23.572 kilometers in diameter and its surface has an albedo between 0.030 and 0.095.

The Collaborative Asteroid Lightcurve Link derives an albedo of 0.0510, typical for that of a carbonaceous asteroid, and a diameter of 23.43 kilometers based on an absolute magnitude of 12.0.

Naming 

This minor planet was named by Dutch astronomer Gerrit Pels after his sister Geertruid (or Geertruida) Hamerslag Pels. Gerrit Pels, who was an assistant astronomer at Leiden Observatory, computed the body's orbit. The minor planet  was named in his honor. The author of the Dictionary of Minor Planet Names, Lutz Schmadel learned about the meaning of this asteroid from Ingrid van Houten-Groeneveld, who was a long-time astronomer at Leiden Observatory.

References

External links 
 Uppsala Southern Station (USS) in Australia
 Asteroid Lightcurve Database (LCDB), query form (info )
 Dictionary of Minor Planet Names, Google books
 Asteroids and comets rotation curves, CdR – Observatoire de Genève, Raoul Behrend
 Discovery Circumstances: Numbered Minor Planets (1)-(5000) – Minor Planet Center
 
 

001267
Discoveries by Hendrik van Gent
Named minor planets
19300423